This page details statistics of the All-Ireland Senior Club Hurling Championship.

General performances

By team

Player records

Miscellaneous
Most All-Ireland winners' medals: 5
T.J. Reid (Ballyhale Shamrocks) – 2007, 2010, 2015, 2019, 2020
Michael Fennelly (Ballyhale Shamrocks) – 2007, 2010, 2015, 2019, 2020
Colin Fennelly (Ballyhale Shamrocks) – 2007, 2010, 2015, 2019, 2020
Eoin Reid (Ballyhale Shamrocks) – 2007, 2010, 2015, 2019, 2020
Most All-Ireland winners' medals: 4
Donie Collins (Blackrock, James Stephens) – 1972, 1974, 1979, 1982
Joe Errity (Birr) – 1995, 1998, 2002, 2003
Brian Whelahan (Birr) – 1995, 1998, 2002, 2003
Gary Cahill (Birr) – 1995, 1998, 2002, 2003
Johnny Pilkington (Birr) – 1995, 1998, 2002, 2003
Declan Pilkington (Birr) – 1995, 1998, 2002, 2003
Simon Whelehan (Birr) – 1995, 1998, 2002, 2003
Eugene McEntee (Portumna) – 2006, 2008, 2009, 2014
Ollie Canning (Portumna) – 2006, 2008, 2009, 2014
Gareth Heagney (Portumna) – 2006, 2008, 2009, 2014
Leo Smith (Portumna) – 2006, 2008, 2009, 2014
Eoin Lynch (Portumna) – 2006, 2008, 2009, 2014
Kevin Hayes (Portumna) – 2006, 2008, 2009, 2014
Andy Smith (Portumna) – 2006, 2008, 2009, 2014
Damien Hayes (Portumna) – 2006, 2008, 2009, 2014
Niall Hayes (Portumna) – 2006, 2008, 2009, 2014
Joe Canning (Portumna) – 2006, 2008, 2009, 2014

Hurling records and statistics